Admontia blanda is a species of fly in the family Tachinidae.

Distribution
Austria, Belgium, Bosnia and Herzegovina, Czech Republic, Denmark, Finland, Germany, Hungary, Italy, Netherlands, Norway, Poland, Romania, Russia, Slovakia, Spain, Sweden, Switzerland, United Kingdom.

References

Insects described in 1820
Exoristinae
Diptera of Europe
Taxa named by Carl Fredrik Fallén